Arcestes is a genus of extinct ceratitid ammonites found in Triassic-aged marine strata.

Description
Their shells were  broad and rounded, giving them an almost spherical appearance.  Unlike many other ammonites, the shells of Arcestes lack keels that would otherwise stabilize them while swimming.  Because of this, some paleontologists have suggested that they were bottom-dwelling crawlers.

The shell of Arcestes is globular or subglobular with periodic narrow transverse constrictions in internal molds due to periodic internal transverse ridges (varices) in the shell. The suture is ammonitic with complexly subdivided elements. The ventral lobe is subdivided by a low median saddle. Lateral lobes and saddles have generally triangular outlines but are deeply embayed by strong projections forming tree-like patterns. They form a series diminishing in size and complexity in a rather straight line going from the venter to the umbilicus in the middle of the shell.

Distribution
Fossils of Arcestes are found in Mid to Upper Triassic marine strata throughout the world, including California (A. pacificus), Nevada  (A (Anisarcestes) mrazici)  and Austria (A. intuslabiatus and A. binacostomus).

Gallery

References 

 Arkell et al.  Mesozoic Ammonoidea. Treaatise on Invertebrate Paleontology, Part L, 1957 Geological Society of America and University of Kansas press, R.C.Moore ed. 
 Johnston, F.N. Trias of New Pass Nevada (New lower Karnic ammonoids); Journal of Paleontology V.15 No 5 p 447-491, Sept 1941

Triassic ammonites of North America
Ceratitida genera
Late Triassic ammonites
Carnian genus first appearances
Norian genera
Rhaetian genus extinctions
Fossil taxa described in 1865
Arcestidae